Jan Guenther Braun is a Canadian writer from Osler, Saskatchewan. Braun is best known for her 2008 novel Somewhere Else, which is considered an important early work of Queer Mennonite literature. She has also published poetry and literary criticism

Braun lived in Winnipeg, Manitoba for many years, where she received a degree in theology at Canadian Mennonite University. She currently works at the University of Toronto in Toronto, Ontario.

References

External links
 Official site 

Mennonite writers
Canadian Mennonites
Writers from Winnipeg
Writers from Saskatchewan
LGBT Mennonites
Year of birth missing (living people)
Living people
Canadian LGBT novelists
21st-century Canadian novelists
21st-century Canadian poets
21st-century Canadian non-fiction writers
Canadian women novelists
Canadian women poets
Canadian women non-fiction writers
Canadian literary critics
Canadian LGBT poets
21st-century Canadian LGBT people